Ashland is a village in Cass County, Illinois, United States. The population was 1,218 at the 2020 census.

Geography

Demographics

As of the 2020 census there were 1,218 people, 539 households, and 381 families residing in the village. The racial makeup of the village was 94.75% White, 0.74% African American, 0.49% Native American, 0.25% Asian, 0.16% from other races, and 3.61% from two or more races. Hispanic or Latino of any race were 0.25% of the population.

There were 539 households, out of which 43.97% had children under the age of 18 living with them, 43.97% were married couples living together, 21.89% had a female householder with no husband present, and 29.31% were non-families. 26.72% of all households were made up of individuals, and 13.91% had someone living alone who was 65 years of age or older. The average household size was 2.76 and the average family size was 2.36.

The village's age distribution consisted of 22.5% under the age of 18, 8.6% from 18 to 24, 21.2% from 25 to 44, 30.8% from 45 to 64, and 16.7% who were 65 years of age or older. The median age was 43.0 years. For every 100 females, there were 87.9 males. For every 100 females age 18 and over, there were 80.9 males.

The median income for a household in the village was $60,104, and the median income for a family was $67,917. Males had a median income of $46,310 versus $36,467 for females. The per capita income for the village was $33,764. About 3.7% of families and 5.3% of the population were below the poverty line, including 3.6% of those under age 18 and 5.7% of those age 65 or over.

References

External links
Ashland Scoop (Village Newsletter)
Prairie Skies Library (Ashland Library)
Printers Ink (Printer)
Ashland High School (Yearbook Archive)

Villages in Cass County, Illinois
Villages in Illinois